Charles Edward Hugo (born February 24, 1974) is an American record producer and multi-instrumentalist. With close friend Pharrell Williams, he formed the production duo the Neptunes in the early 1990s, with whom he has produced songs for many recording artists. He is also a member of the band N.E.R.D., alongside Williams and Shay Haley.

Career
Hugo and Pharrell Williams were announced to be inducted into the Songwriters Hall of Fame as a part of the 2020 class.

Discography

With N.E.R.D.
 In Search of... (2002)
 Fly or Die (2004)
 Seeing Sounds (2008)
 Nothing (2010)
 No One Ever Really Dies (2017)

With the Neptunes
 Clones (2003)

Personal life
Hugo has three children, born in 1998, 2000, and 2014.

See also
 The Neptunes production discography

References

External links

1974 births
Living people
Musicians from Portsmouth, Virginia
Musicians from Virginia Beach, Virginia
Songwriters from Virginia
American musicians of Filipino descent
Grammy Award winners
Hip hop record producers
N.E.R.D. members
East Coast hip hop musicians
American male saxophonists
The Neptunes members
21st-century saxophonists